The 1987–88 La Liga season, the 57th since its establishment, started on August 29, 1987, and finished on May 22, 1988.

Real Madrid finished the season as champions for the third season running, the runners-up this time being Real Sociedad, while Barcelona finished a disappointing sixth, though they did at least have Copa Del Rey success as consolation for their lack of form in the league.

Teams and location 
This season, the league was expanded to 20 teams and the relegation playoffs returned.

League table

Relegation playoff

First leg

Second leg

Results table

Pichichi Trophy 

La Liga seasons
1987–88 in Spanish football leagues
Spain